Jean-Pierre Le Ridant (4 February 1948) is a French politician and administrative framework.
He is member of the Union for a Popular Movement party. He served as deputy of the 1st constituency of Loire-Atlantique from 2002 to 2007. He was beaten in his turn by François de Rugy, Green candidate supported by the PS on June 19, 2007. Jean-Pierre Le Ridant also elected deputy of the XIIe legislatures.

Biography
Jean-Pierre Le Ridant was born in Riaillé, France on 1948. He was part of the Union for a Popular Movement group.

References 

1948 births
Living people
Union for a Popular Movement politicians
20th-century French politicians
21st-century French politicians